Grethe Wolan (born 15 October 1968) is a Norwegian curler, born in Trondheim. She competed in curling at the 1998 Winter Olympics.

References

External links

1968 births
Living people
Sportspeople from Trondheim
Norwegian female curlers
Olympic curlers of Norway 
Curlers at the 1998 Winter Olympics